Grand Central may refer to:

Transportation
 Grand Central Terminal, train terminal in Manhattan, New York City:
Grand Central Madison station, a Long Island Rail Road station complex under Grand Central Terminal
 Grand Central–42nd Street (New York City Subway), a New York City Subway station complex adjacent to Grand Central Terminal, consisting of:
 Grand Central – 42nd Street (IRT Lexington Avenue Line), serving the  trains
 Grand Central (IRT Flushing Line), serving the  trains
 Grand Central (IRT 42nd Street Shuttle), serving the  train
 Grand Central (train operating company), British train operator running services between London, and Sunderland and Bradford
 Grand Central Airport, Midrand, South Africa
 Grand Central Airport (California), United States
 Grand Central Parkway, Queens, New York City
 Grand Central Station (Chicago), former train station in Chicago, Illinois
 Grand Central tram stop, Birmingham, England

Other uses
 Grand Central, St. Petersburg, Florida, a district
 Grand Central (store), former discount department store bought out by Fred Meyer in 1984
 Grand Central (film), a 2013 French film
 Grand Central Band, New Zealand Band
 Grand Central, Birmingham, a shopping centre that is part of New Street railway station in Birmingham, England
 Grand Central Dispatch, computing technology from Apple Inc.
 GrandCentral, a Voice over IP service that was acquired by Google
 Grand Central Hall, building in Liverpool, England
 Unite Grand Central, student halls of residence also in Liverpool, England
 Grand Central Records, independent record label based in Manchester, England
 Grand Central Stockport, entertainment and leisure complex in Stockport, Greater Manchester, England
 Grand Central Station (radio series), 1937–1954
 Hotel Grand Central Ltd, a Singaporean-based company that owns the Hotel Grand Chancellor group
 Grand Central Publishing, a division of the Hachette Book Group
 "Grand Central", a song by No Devotion from Permanence

See also
Grand Central Station (disambiguation)
Great Central (disambiguation)